Gur Shelef (born January 10, 1974) is an Israeli former professional basketball player. Standing at 201 cm (6' 7") he played at the small forward and power forward positions. His father, Ami Shelef, and brother, Uri Shelef, were also basketball players.

References

1974 births
Living people
Antwerp Giants players
Expatriate basketball people in Belgium
Hapoel Galil Elyon players
Ironi Ramat Gan players
Israeli Basketball Premier League players
Israeli men's basketball players
Maccabi Tel Aviv B.C. players
Small forwards